Reginald of Sweden or Reynold - Swedish: Ragnvald and Ragvald - may refer to:

Ragnvald Knaphövde, Swedish king around 1125
Reginald, Swedish prince around 1100, son of King Inge the Elder